This is an incomplete list of best-selling singles in South Korea. All singles listed here have officially sold at least three million copies. Unless otherwise specified, all sales figures are digital downloads compiled by the Korea Music Content Industry Association (KMCA) for the Gaon Music Chart since 2010.

Background and details
Prior to the establishment of the Gaon Chart in 2010, South Korea's music charts were supplied by the Music Industry Association of Korea (MIAK), which stopped compiling data in 2008. There are no official cumulative chart records for digital singles prior to 2010.
 South Korea has experienced a decline in digital music sales volume which began in late 2012. The price of digital downloads was greatly inflated, and as a result, only five songs released since 2013 — "Wild Flower" (2014) by Park Hyo-shin, "Shape of You" (2017) by Ed Sheeran, "Every Day, Every Moment" (2018) by Paul Kim, and "Friday" (2013) and "Through the Night" (2017) by IU—have surpassed the fifth million sales mark.
 All total sales are rounded to the nearest 100 and expressed in thousands.
 The figures listed below are somewhat lower than the actual sales. In general, they are merely the sums of currently available or archived sales numbers counted until the very last month or year each of the songs charted. The Gaon Music Chart has only recently officially announced release-to-date track sales, although only listing the songs that have reached multiples of 2.5 million copies sold.
 The Gaon Music Chart stopped releasing sales figures for songs in 2018.
 The following figures do not include sales from remixes.

Records

Best-selling single by year (since 2010)

Domestic songs

International songs

Artists with most downloaded songs (since 2010)

See also

 Gaon Music Chart
 K-pop
 List of best-selling albums in South Korea
 List of best-selling singles
 List of certified songs in South Korea

Footnotes

References

External links
 Gaon Music Chart official website 
 KMCIA official website 

South Korea
South Korean music-related lists